Paul McLaney (born 1975 in Stockton-on-Tees, England) is a New Zealand-based pop music composer, singer and guitarist.

Discography

Solo albums
1997 – Pedestrian – Paul McLaney
1998 – The Prayer Engine – Paul McLaney & The Avalanche Trio
2004 – The Shadows of Birds Flying Fall Slowly Down The Tall Buildings – Paul McLaney
2006 – EDIN – Paul McLaney
2007 – Diamond Side – Paul McLaney
2017 – Play On – Paul McLaney
2020 – The Old Traditions – Paul McLaney and Raashi Malik

Gramsci
2000 – Permanence – Gramsci
2002 – Object – Gramsci
2005 – Like Stray Voltage – Gramsci
2020 – Inheritance – Gramsci

The Impending Adorations
2011 – Broken Science e.p. – The Impending Adorations
2012 – Gestalt – The Impending Adorations
2013 – Intentions – The Impending Adorations
2013 – Further – The Impending Adorations
2015 – The Best Is Yet To Come (single) – The Impending Adorations
2015 – Threshold – The Impending Adorations
2019 – Allies – The Impending Adorations
2019 – Alliances 1: A Handful of Dust' The Impending Adorations feat Jef Boyle

Collaborations
2010 – Nameless Sons 
2011 – Immram: The Voyage of the Corvus Corrone2016 – Heart's Ease – Music from the Pop-up Globe 
2017 – Under The Greenwood Tree – Music from the Pop-up GlobeWork for theatre
2014 – Speaking in Tongues – Silo Theatre
2015 – FALLOUT: The Sinking of the Rainbow Warrior – The Large Group
2015 – Enlightenment  – Auckland Theatre Company
2015 – 8 Gigabytes of Hardcore Pornography – Silo Theatre
2015 – Love & Information – The Actor's Programme
2015 – K Rd Strip – Okareka
2016 – Romeo & Juliet – The Pop-up Globe
2016 – Twelfth Night – The Pop-up Globe
2016 – The Voice in My Head – Perendale
2016 – Venus in Fur – Auckland Theatre Company
2016 – Vernon God Little – The Actor's Programme
2016 – Lucrece – Auckland Shakespeare Company
2016 – Manawa – Okareka
2016 – Once There Was A Woman – Theatre Physical
2016 – Play On2017 – Othello – The Pop-up Globe
2017 – Much Ado About Nothing – The Pop-up Globe
2017 – As You Like It – The Pop-up Globe
2017 – Henry V – The Pop-up Globe
2017 – A Midsummer Night’s Dream – The Pop-up Globe
2018 – The Merchant of Venice – The Pop-up Globe
2018 – Julius Caesar – The Pop-up Globe
2018 – MacBeth – The Pop-up Globe
2018 – Comedy of Errors– The Pop-up Globe
2018 – Conversations With Dead Relatives – Flaxworks
2018 – A Gambler’s Guide to Dying – Burrowed Time
2018 – The World of Wearable Arts: 30th Anniversary Show2018 – The Taming of the Shrew – The Pop-up Globe
2018 – Richard III  – The Pop-up Globe
2018 – HOMOS – Brilliant Adventures
2019 – Hamlet  – The Pop-up Globe 
2019 – Measure for Measure –  – The Pop-up Globe 
2019 – Half of the Sky – Massive Theatre Company
2019 – The World of Wearable Arts 
2019 – Romeo & Juliet – The Pop-up Globe 
2019 – Twelfth Night – The Pop-up Globe 
2020 – Te Whare Kupua'' – Massive Theatre Company

References

External links
About Paul McLaney

New Zealand musicians
English pop singers
English pop guitarists
English composers
Living people
1975 births